Philip Westlake was a 19th-century British painter, the brother of Nathaniel Westlake, one of the partners in Lavers, Barraud and Westlake, Ecclesiastical Designers.

Works
 Adoration of the Shepherds, Church of St Mary the Virgin, Cardiff.
 St Dominic's altarpiece in St Dominic's Priory Church.
 Mural of Our Lord with Our Lady and John the Baptist, St. Mary's Church, Ryde.

References

External links
Portrait of Westlake (1873) by Walter William Ouless, in the Tate.

Year of death missing
British painters